All American is an American sports drama television series, created by April Blair that premiered on The CW on October 10, 2018. The series is inspired by the life of professional American football player Spencer Paysinger, with Daniel Ezra in the lead role. In March 2022, the series was renewed for a fifth season which premiered on October 10, 2022. In January 2023, the series was renewed for a sixth season.

Premise
When a rising high school American football player from South L.A. is recruited to play for Beverly Hills High, the wins, losses and struggles of two families from vastly different worlds—Crenshaw and Beverly Hills—begin to collide. Inspired by the life of pro football player Spencer Paysinger.

Cast and characters

Overview

Main

 Daniel Ezra as Spencer James, based on Spencer Paysinger, a star wide receiver at Crenshaw High School who transfers to Beverly Hills High to play American football and then returns to South Crenshaw High in season 3. He also plays safety, kickoff returner, and running back. Spencer takes on a lot of responsibility to help his community, being the leader of the football team and taking care of his family and friends takes a toll on the star player. He patched up his strained relationship with his father Corey and quit football the day after a ring ceremony due to the death of his father. Days later, he was included in the top 300 college prospect ranking, but he was still grieving from Corey's death. After he got shot by one of Tyrone's affiliates, he got surgery to remove the bullet so he could return to playing football. He is currently dating Olivia. In college, as his struggles to rise up the wide receiver's depth chart continues to lead to nowhere, he offered to switch to kicker and gunner, positions he played in Pop Warner while recovering from his shoulder injury, where there is no depth. However, by midseason, he played both as gunner and wide receiver.
 Bre-Z as Tamia "Coop" Cooper, Spencer's lesbian friend and Patience's girlfriend from Crenshaw High. While she tried to warn Shawn off the gang, she started to take the gang life more seriously after Shawn was killed off, restarting the chain of revenge killings between rival gangs that started with Shawn's brother, Brandon, the year before. Also, as she was a minor at the time, she couldn't take over the lease on Shawn's rental house, even if she was to be emancipated from her mother. When she moved back in after she helped with the arrest of Tyrone Moore, she reverted to being a songwriter and DJ. At the end of season 3, she was shot by Monique Moore after she found out Mo's plan to avenge her brother's death. She managed to survive, but along with that came side effects regarding her health, which played a big factor as to why she decided to quit making music. She was also caught up in legal investigations regarding the shooting, distracting her from continuing to make music.
 Greta Onieogou as Layla Keating, Spencer and Asher's ex-girlfriend from Beverly High. Her father is a very successful record producer, but her mother was killed in a car accident in Colorado. She has a complicated friendship with Olivia. Her father was one of the boosters that donated to refurbish the locker rooms of Rose Bowl, home of UCLA Bruins. In season 2, she became Coop's producer. By season 4, she became Patience's producer after Coop quit making music due to legal cases against her and health problems. She is currently dating Jordan.
 Samantha Logan as Olivia Baker, Billy and Laura's daughter, Willie's granddaughter, and Jordan's twin sister. She is a recovering drug addict and alcoholic who has been in and out of rehab. Her best friend is Layla but their friendship becomes strained when Olivia reveals she had a one-night stand with Asher, who she later ends up dating. Olivia was Spencer's first friend at Beverly and they form a strong friendship that later ends up romantic, where she eventually becomes his girlfriend. She became President of the Black Student Caucus and started Beverley High's own Black Lives Matter movement. In season 3, she starts a podcast called "Liv the Truth" to help bring power back to the Black community. In season 4, she pursues a career in journalism by attending Golden Angeles University, the same college as Spencer and Jordan. She and Spencer break up in the beginning of season 5. 
 Michael Evans Behling as Jordan Baker, Billy and Laura's son, Olivia's twin brother, Willie's grandson, and quarterback for Beverly High. Jordan was initially jealous of Spencer but the two quickly formed a friendship. In season 2, Jordan had become very rebellious and his behavior was out of control. Jordan got into fights and crashed his sister's car and lost his trust in his mother when she punished him for his rebellious actions. He was tricked into thinking he got Simone pregnant. Simone gave up her child, Jordan was not the father. In Rolling the Dice, Jordan and Simone got married in Vegas. They later on got the marriage annulled and remained a couple. In season 4, he got a scholarship offer from Golden Angeles University. He also became closer with Layla, making his long-distance relationship with Simone complicated to manage.In season 4 he and Simone break up. He is currently dating Layla.
 Cody Christian as Asher Adams, wide receiver for Beverly High and the ex-boyfriend of Layla and Olivia. His father lost all of their family's money, which resulted in Asher's mother leaving. Asher and his father rent a guest house from another family that is always out of the country. Asher pretends the mansion is his to keep up the appearance his family has money, until he must confess that his father is laid off and has become broke. Asher found out why his parents split up, his father told her mother to stay away from him and his mother was an ex-hooker and that is how his parents met. In the end of season 3, it is revealed that he has a heart condition and can no longer play football due to him taking steroids in season 2. His mother was an alumnus of Malibu Charter School, coached by Billy's former NFL rival. He was suspended for 2 games due to intoxication at Homecoming Dance after Layla broke up with him, and then was kicked off the team after he tipped off Malibu with Beverly's entire offensive playbook. In 2017, he was with Layla and was an alcoholic. After winning State title, he became more dedicated because his scout stock actually fell due to lack of targets. He, along with Spencer, became offensive captain in season 2 while Jordan was left out. In The Art of Peer Pressure, it's revealed that Asher was taking steroids. In season 3, he was still under suspension from playing football due to taking steroids. After paying for his mistakes, he was allowed to play again. After he got an athletic full scholarship to Coastal California, he was devastated to learn that he developed cardiomyopathy, a rare heart condition. As Asher helped out Jordan and JJ during a combine, he realized that he could still pursue his passion of football through coaching. In season 4, he managed to move from the laundry manager of the Costa California Manta Rays to scouting against the Golden Angeles Condors, which includes Jordan and Spencer.Asher is currently dating a girl named Jaymee and they are expecting their first child together.
 Karimah Westbrook as Grace James, Spencer and Dillon's mother who secretly knew Billy a long time ago and had a one-night stand with him. However, it turns out that Billy, Grace and Corey all were graduate class of 1994 in South Crenshaw. In season 4, her boyfriend D'Angelo proposed to her after getting permission from Spencer and Dillon.
 Monét Mazur as Laura Fine-Baker, Billy's wife who is a lawyer and also Olivia and Jordan's mother. She is a very strict disciplinarian who insists structure and discipline. In season 2, she tried to keep the family together and she spent most of the series laying down the law and punishing Jordan. Jordan got into trouble with fighting and crashing his sister's car and got tricked into thinking he got a girl pregnant. Mostly, she decided to file for separation. In The Art of Peer Pressure, she is elected District Attorney of Los Angeles County. She and Billy begin reuniting and soon got remarried in season 3. In season 4, she quit the DA job after realizing the systematic failure of the system, and managed to fight Preach's murder charges, and reached a deal for Coop to serve community service for her part for obstruction of justice covering Preach's involvement in Monique's death.
 Taye Diggs as Billy Baker (season 1–5), the coach for Beverly Hills High American football team who recruits Spencer; Laura's husband and Olivia and Jordan's father. Like Spencer, he was an alumnus of both Crenshaw High and Beverly Hills High, and played in the NFL as a former second-round pick, before his career was cut short by knee injuries. His father also abandoned him as a child. In season 2, it was also revealed that both he and Corey played against each other in Pop Warner, and he actually left South Crenshaw because he could not deal with the loss of his mother, who was the history teacher of South Crenshaw High. In season 2, he tried to fight to repair the marriage with Laura, but she decided to file for separation. By the end of season 2, he resigns and becomes the head coach for the high school he played for. In season 3, he and Laura get remarried. In season 4, he was the interim principal of South Crenshaw High, where he eventually got promoted to full-time principal. In season 5, he is offered a job at Golden Angeles University, in which he initially accepts, but turns down after Spencer convinced him otherwise. Shortly after, he dies saving one of his players when their bus crashes. 
 Jalyn Hall as Dillon James, Spencer's younger brother. Like Spencer, he is also a grade-A student and is very mature for his young age. He likes sci-fi comics and wanted to play football like his brother Spencer, but at the moment, he is too young, so he sticks to playing basketball. He was later found to be Corey's son after a private dispute about his paternity. In season 4, he stopped playing basketball, but developed his skills as an illustrator as a way of acting out against his least favorite history teacher. In order to stop him from spiraling out, since he feels trapped in Crenshaw due to his lack of athletic talent, Spencer asks him to be his graphic designer for his social media brand.
 Chelsea Tavares as Patience Robinson (season 3–present; recurring seasons 1–2), Coop's love interest. An aspiring lyricist, but because she has a supportive family when she came out as a lesbian, she often struggles to understand Coop's hesitance to let her meet Coop's mother and her more supportive church friends. Her career began taking off in season 4, but Coops' criminal charges have been holding her back. They broke up in season 4, but remain as housemates along with Layla, Jordan and Olivia.
 Hunter Clowdus as JJ Parker (season 4–present; recurring seasons 1–3), an outside linebacker/QB2/tight end for the Beverly High Eagles. A party boy that likes to organize parties, but is also a very competent pool player. In season 3, however, he showed interest in returning to his junior high school position of QB after new Coach Montes saw his arm strength, accuracy and pocket movement to be better than Jordan, but still lost the QB competition. He was excited to tell his friends that he got a scholarship offer from Coastal California, but this made things awkward for a while as Asher realized that it was his original scholarship before his injury. In college, he reverted to a linebacker, and became a Zen master and a yogi instead of solely focusing on football. In college, he was failing Intro to Film Studies at one point because he plagiarized his own work from high school. His carefree and happy-go-lucky attitude came from his freshman year when he and his uncle almost died in a car accident while on vacation in Hawaii because his uncle had been drinking. He used his cut of the NIL money to extend the lease on the beach house that him, Spencer, Jordan, and Asher were all living in during the summer before entering college.

Recurring

 Jay Reeves as Shawn Scott (season 1), a drug dealer and gang member who sometimes does good deeds, but was shot dead by rival gangs as part of revenge killing in front of his house after he paid Tyrone off to get out of the gang
 Spence Moore II as Chris Jackson (seasons 1, 3 & 4; guest season 2), a quarterback at Crenshaw High. Despite initially resenting Spencer for moving to Beverly, he helped Beverly Eagles defeat Malibu using Crenshaw's old playbook.
 Michelle Hayden as Ripley (season 1), a cheerleader for Malibu Charter School, and love interest of Jordan, but she abuses him as she is a marijuana user, to get him into trouble
 Demetrius Shipp Jr. as Tyrone Moore (seasons 1 & 2), a gang leader in Crenshaw. He was the mastermind that killed both Brandon and Shawn Scott. He also put Preach into the hospital by shooting. He was apprehended by police on State Championship night after Coop set up a police ambush. However, he was released from jail after Preach decided not to testify. He was later killed on his front porch by Ruth Scott in revenge for killing her sons. He is the main antagonist of the first two seasons.
 Brent Jennings as Willie Baker (season 1; guest seasons 3-5), Billy's father and Olivia and Jordan's grandfather. Former Beverly Hills Football coach that raised Billy to become an NFL player, he believed Billy abandoned him after going pro and leaving Crenshaw. He disapproves of his son's lifestyle and used to refuse to accept his daughter-in-law because she is white. Despite this, he receives monthly payments from his son. He also conned money from his grandson by suggesting he couldn't afford medical care for his diabetes. In season 4, he suffered from a heart attack on prom night, which causes Billy and Laura to move into his house him to keep an eye on him. Becoming tired of their presence, he decided to move to Florida and stay with his friend Jerome.
 Casper Van Dien as Harold Adams (seasons 1 & 2; guest season 3), Asher's birth father, who Asher tried to help after he recovered from his own alcoholism
 Mitchell Edwards as Cam Watkins (seasons 1 & 3; guest seasons 2, 4 & 5), South Crenshaw's new receiver after Spencer left. He has great size, speed, and athleticism but is often outplayed by Spencer as the cornerback due to his poor hands and easy tells. In season 3, he transferred to Westlake not wanting to play as a backup to Spencer.
 Chad L. Coleman as Corey James (seasons 1 & 2), a former American football player and coach who is Spencer and Dillon's biological father. He also played against Billy since Pop Warner, also an aspiring running back. However, his football dreams was dashed after high school because he was stricken with life-threatening illness, which he later died of.
 Da'Vinchi as Darnell Hayes (seasons 2; guest seasons 3 & 4), a quarterback at South Crenshaw who lived with Corey for 7 years in Nevada, Corey's son from a previous relationship. While having a frosty relationship with Spencer, they reconciled in Corey's final days. He was invited to live with Grace soon after Corey died. He suddenly had to leave, because his birth mother was hurt while on military duty. He came back for a brief moment to convince Spencer not to give up football to save his community.
 Kayla Smith as Rochelle Mosley (season 2), a recent graduate of Beverly Hills High School and aspiring sports journalist
 Kareem J. Grimes as Cordell "Preach" Simms (seasons 2-5; guest season 1), a gang member who initially follows Tyrone because he thought Tyrone saved Brandon's lives by serving two prison terms together. However, when Coop made him realize the Scotts were both killed by Tyrone, he tried to set a plan to kill him, but he failed, and was shot and critically injured, and was recovering in Intensive Care Unit post-operation. In Season 2, he got a job as a security guard after he recovered and helped Coop gain an audience for her first show, but was arrested after Tyrone set him up and was sent back to prison for assaulting Buggs and breaking his parole violation. He was released in the season 3 premiere after Monique got his 1st strike conviction overturned. In season 4, he started working as an English Literature tutor for the football team at South Crenshaw High when Billy was an interim principal, but was arrested at the school for Monique's murder before the charges were dropped and got probation for unlawful possession of firearms due to "justifiable homicide". Despite this, Billy gives him another chance and lets him continue to teach the students after seeing how well he connects with them.
 Corey Reynolds as Cliff Mosley (season 2), the head of the Beverly High School Boosters until he was voted out as he tried to relinquish Billy Baker from his coaching role without his presence
 Asjha Cooper as Kia Williams (seasons 2 & 3), South Crenshaw High student, Spencer's ex-girlfriend, and an avid social activist. Her uncle, Flip Williams, is a reformed Bloods gang member.
 Geffri Maya as Simone Hicks (seasons 2-4; guest season 5), a Beverly High student who becomes pregnant and marries Jordan when they are in Las Vegas. The marriage was short lived, but the two continued dating. She gave birth to a baby boy, but decided to give the baby up for adoption. After graduating from Beverly High and reconciling with the foster family to retain visiting rights, she applies to go to Bringston University, a historically black college in Atlanta at the request of her aunt, where she decides to revive her dream to become an aspiring tennis player, leading to the spinoff series All American: Homecoming.
 Dina Meyer as Gwen Adams (season 2, guest seasons 3 & 4), Asher's mother. She remarried in season 4.
 Lahmard J. Tate as Flip Williams (season 2; guest season 1), Kia's uncle and a reformed Blood gang member
 Jordan Belfi as Principal Ed Landon (season 2; guest seasons 1 & 4), Crenshaw's former principal
 Elvis Nolasco (season 2; guest season 1) and Ray Campbell (season 4; guest seasons 3 & 5) as JP Keating, Layla's father, a music mogul that grew up in Harlem, New York. Donated to build Rose Bowl's Locker Room. As an alumnus of UCLA, he is effectively a lifetime member of the ground. He returned to her life for good when he realizes that Layla attempted suicide at the exact same place as her mother. He stepped back from his roles in his record label after meeting a new girlfriend.
 Erica Peeples as Monique "Mo" Moore (season 3, guest season 2), an attorney and Tyrone's older sister and Amina's mother. She shot Coop, then was killed by Preach for "justifiable homicide". She is the main antagonist of Season 3.
 Alexandra Barreto as Coach Montes (seasons 3 & 4, guest season 5), new head coach for the Beverly High Eagles. Her husband is also a coach.
 Alondra Delgado as Vanessa Montes (season 3), a new student at Beverly High School and the new head coach's daughter. She had a summer fling with Asher.
 Noah Gray-Cabey as Frausto (seasons 3 & 4; guest season 5), a teammate of Spencer's from Crenshaw. He is unwelcoming to both Spencer and Coach Baker.
 Anna Lore as Carrie (seasons 3; guest seasons 2, 4), Layla's friend, but also a recovering alcoholic with serious attachment and abandonment issues. While Layla saved Carrie from jumping off the cliff, it changed Layla into a control freak in season 4. She returned in season 4 when they reunited in San Diego, and reassured Layla that she has moved back with her parents, and has finally found a stable job, which finally brought proper closure.
 Simeon Daise as Jabari Long (seasons 3-5), a teammate of Spencer's from South Crenshaw High, an outside linebacker
 Ella Simone Tabu as Amina Simms, (season 4; guest seasons 3 & 5) Preach and Monique's daughter
 Deric Augustine as Clay Taylor (seasons 4 & 5), A musician Layla manages who becomes a love interest, The Current CEO of 'Clay Taylor Entertainment' Formerly 'Keating Records' which is a parent company to 'Formonica Records' 
 Mustafa Speaks as Kenny Boone (seasons 4 & 5), wide receiver coach at Golden Angeles University
 Zachary S. Williams as Isaiah Winfield (season 4; guest season 5), a wide receiver who goes to Golden Angeles University with Spencer, Jordan and Olivia
 Sean Carrigan as Ivan Garrett (seasons 4 & 5), head coach at Golden Angeles University. He considers Isaiah to be his preferred wideout candidate for scholarship. As a head coach with a defensive background, he is also a very traditional fundamental coach with 46 as the base defense. He is the secondary antagonist of Season 4 and main antagonist of Season 5.
 Miya Horcher as Jaymee (seasons 4 & 5), Asher's new girlfriend & baby mama. She is a waitress at Asher's stepfather's fine-dining restaurant, but had to take leave in the summer as she suffers from lupus. In season 5, after 3 months in remission, her symptoms returned on Billy Baker's birthday that required hospitalization, which was the first time Asher saw her symptoms develop and worsen.
 Christian James as Wade Waters (season 4) QB1 for the Golden Angeles University Condors, who after gaining NIL deals skipped practice, then lost his starting spot to Jordan. He is the main antagonist of Season 4.
 Journey Montana as Davita (season 4), a branding and marketing student and also a player for the Women's Soccer Team at Golden Angeles University who helps Spencer build a social media presence
 Lamon Archey as Superintendent D'Angelo Carter (seasons 3 & 4, guest seasons 2 & 5), the interim principal at South Crenshaw High. In the past, he also went to South Crenshaw with Corey and Billy, but was sent to boarding school after his freshman year due to the bullying culture of the football team.
 Kamar de los Reyes as Coach Montes (season 4; guest season 5), head coach at Coastal California University.
 Madison Shamoun as Skye (season 4; guest season 5), Coop's new love interest
 Ashley Argota Torres as Gia (season 5), Layla's assistant
 Pauline Dyer as Alicia (season 5), Spencer's new love interest
 Darone Okolie as Sal Dominguez (season 5)
 Tre Hale as Kai (season 5)

Notable guests
 Chip Kelly as Himself (special appearance season 2)
 Cordae as Himself (special guest appearance season 3)
DeSean Jackson as Himself (special guest appearance season 3)
 Joanna "JoJo" Levesque as Sabine (special guest star season 4), Layla's mentor in musicianship and production
 Morris Chestnut as Rick Barnes (special guest star season 5), the GAU's athletic director

Crossover cast
Cast members of the spin-off All American: Homecoming
 Peyton Alex Smith as Damon Sims Raymond (season 3)
 Kelly Jenrette as  Dr. Amara Patterson (seasons 3 & 4), Current President of Bringston University 
 Cory Hardrict as Coach Marcus Turner (season 3), Baseball Head Coach of Bringston University
 Sylvester Powell as Jesse Raymond, Jr (season 3)
 Netta Walker as Keisha McCalla (seasons 3 & 5)
 Camille Hyde as Thea Mays (season 3)
 Leonard Roberts as Zeke Allen (season 3), Former President of Bringston University
 John Marshall Jones as Leonard Shaw (season 3), Baseball Head Coach at Hawkins University

Episodes

Production

Development
In September 2017, it was announced that the CW veteran Greg Berlanti had two pilots in development for the network, one of them inspired by the life of NFL football player Spencer Paysinger. It was also revealed that April Blair would write and executive produce the untitled project, with Berlanti and Sarah Schechter executive producing. A pilot for the potential series, then called Spencer, was ordered in January 2018. The pilot was ordered to series on May 11, 2018. On October 2, 2018, it was reported that Blair had stepped down as showrunner due to "personal reasons" and was subsequently replaced with co-executive producer Nkechi Okoro Carroll, who was also made an executive producer. On October 8, 2018, The CW ordered five additional scripts for the series. On November 8, 2018, it was announced that The CW had ordered an additional three episodes of the series, bringing the first season total up to 16 episodes. On April 24, 2019, it was reported that The CW renewed the series for a second season. The second season premiered on October 7, 2019. On October 8, 2019, The CW ordered three more episodes for the show's second season. On January 7, 2020, the series was renewed for a third season which is set to premiere on January 18, 2021. On February 3, 2021, The CW renewed the series for a fourth season which premiered on October 25, 2021. On March 22, 2022, The CW renewed the series for a fifth season which premiered on October 10, 2022. On January 11, 2023, The CW renewed the series for a sixth season.

Casting
On February 22, 2018, Taye Diggs was cast as Billy Baker, followed a week later with Samantha Logan cast as Olivia Baker, his daughter. The rest of the cast was filled out through mid-March with Bre-Z and Greta Onieogou cast on March 15, 2018 as characters Tamia Cooper and Layla Keating, respectively, with Monet Mazur, Michael Evans Behling, and Cody Christian cast the next day, to play Laura Fine-Baker, Olivia's mother; Jordan Baker, Olivia's brother; and Asher, respectively. Karimah Westbrook was cast as Grace James on March 19, 2018 and British actor Daniel Ezra was cast in the lead role of Spencer James on March 21, 2018. On May 31, 2018, Jalyn Hall was promoted to a series regular as Dillon, Spencer's little brother. On October 1, 2020, Chelsea Tavares was promoted to series regular for the third season. On October 4, 2021, Hunter Clowdus was promoted to series regular for the fourth season.

Filming
Filming for the series takes place in Los Angeles, California. Filming for the first season began the following July. Filming took place in Thomas Jefferson High School in South Central Los Angeles known as South Crenshaw High School in the series.

Reception

Ratings

Critical response
On review aggregator website Rotten Tomatoes, the first season holds an approval rating of 92%, based on 25 reviews, and an average rating of 6.92/10. The website's critical consensus reads, "All American'''s ambitious attempts to tackle class struggles and classroom drama largely play thanks to its winning cast—an auspicious start to a promising new series". Metacritic, which uses a weighted average, assigned a score of 63 out of 100 based on 15 critics, indicating "generally favorable reviews".

The second season has a 100% approval rating on Rotten Tomatoes, based on 6 reviews, with an average rating of 8.75/10.

Accolades

 Release 
In New Zealand, All American is aired as a web-only series on TVNZ OnDemand. It released the same episode as the US at 8pm Thursdays (NZDT), 5 hours after it is aired in the US, during season one. Season two was released on the same day as the US at 7pm Tuesdays (NZDT), 4 hours after it is aired in the USA. Season three was released on the same day as the US at 8pm Tuesdays (NZDT), 4 hours after it is aired in the USA.
In the United Kingdom, the series was acquired by ITV2.

Spin-off

On December 18, 2020, it was announced that The CW was in early development of a backdoor pilot for a spin-off of Geffri Maya's character Simone Hicks reprising her role from All American. On February 1, 2021, The CW gave the spin-off a pilot order and titled it as All American: Homecoming. On March 29, 2021, Peyton Alex Smith, Cory Hardrict, Kelly Jenrette, Sylverser Powell, Netta Walker, and Camille Hyde were cast to star in the pilot. On May 24, 2021, All American: Homecoming was picked up to series. The backdoor pilot aired on July 5, 2021 as part of the third season of All American. The series is scheduled to premiere on February 21, 2022. On December 16, 2021, it was announced that Mitchell Edwards who recurs as Cam Watkins on All American'' is set to reprise his role on this series as a series regular.

Notes

References

External links
 
 

2010s American drama television series
2010s American high school television series
2010s American LGBT-related drama television series
2018 American television series debuts
2020s American drama television series
2020s American high school television series
2020s American LGBT-related drama television series
American football television series
The CW original programming
English-language television shows
Television series about teenagers
Television series by CBS Studios
Television series by Warner Bros. Television Studios
Television shows filmed in Los Angeles
Television shows set in Beverly Hills, California
Works about high school football in the United States